Richard L. Gwinn (born  c. 1936) is a former American football player and coach. He was the head coach at Weber State College in Ogden, Utah, from 1973 to 1976, compiling a  record.

Playing career
Gwinn played guard at the University of Oklahoma under head coach Bud Wilkinson from 1956 to 1958. The Sooners were undefeated in 1956 and lost only once in both 1957 and 1958.

Coaching career
Gwinn was an assistant coach at Northeastern Oklahoma A&M College in Miami, Oklahoma, from 1968 to 1970, when the team compiled a  record in three seasons and won the NJCAA National Football Championship in 1969. He was hired as the defensive coordinator at Weber State in the Big Sky Conference in 1971 and succeeded Sark Arslanian as head coach in January 1973. During his fourth year in 1976, Gwinn announced his resignation in mid-October, effective at the end of the season.

Head coaching record

References

Year of birth missing (living people)
1930s births
Living people
American football guards
Oklahoma Sooners football players
Weber State Wildcats football coaches
Junior college football coaches in the United States